Yenikapı Transfer Center, referred to as Yenikapı, is an underground transportation complex in Istanbul. It is located in south-central Fatih in the neighborhood of Yenikapı, hence the name of the hub. The complex is right next to the, indefinitely closed, Yenikapı railway station and a short walk away from the Yenikapı Ferry Terminal and İDO ferry service. Yenikapı complex links two stations of Istanbul Metro to a railway station of the Turkish State Railways on the trans-Bosphorus Marmaray tunnel. Yenikapı is the largest rapid transit station in Turkey.

History
Construction of the Marmaray project started at Yenikapı in May 2004. The new Yenikapı station site was chosen to be just north of the existing railway station and would be built underground as part of the trans-Bosphorus tunnel. Yenikapı was expected to be completed in December 2009 but due to archaeological findings at the construction site delayed the project by four years. In 2008 plans to extend the M2 and the M1 lines south were finalized and Yenikapı was chosen as the southern terminus. Construction of the M2's southern extension started in January 2009 with the Golden Horn Metro Bridge across the Golden Horn.  The project was expected to open in August 2010, but due to delays it wasn't opened until 2014. The Marmaray section was the first part of the complex to open, entering service on 29 October 2013. The M2 section opened on 15 February 2014, followed by the M1 section on 9 November 2014.

Metro platforms

M1
The M1 platform is the newest part of the Yenikapı complex, completed in November 2014. It is the eastern terminal station for the M1 line and has two side platforms serviced by two tracks. M1ᴀ service departs from track 1 to Atatürk Havalimanı (Atatürk Airport) while M1ʙ service departs from track 2 to Kirazlı.

Layout

M2

The M2 platforms were opened on 15 February 2014 and is the southern terminus of the M2 line. Having three tracks and two island platforms along with a high ceiling, it is the largest station in the complex. Most trains use the center track while the Spanish solution method of boarding and  alighting is used via the two island platforms. The walls and pillars are decorated with transparent Turquoise tiles and other ceramics. Escalators lead up to the station lobby and are adjacent to the escalators to the Marmaray platform.

Layout

Marmaray platform

The Turkish State Railways (TCDD) services Yenikapı via an island platform on the trans-Bosphorus Marmaray rail tunnel. This portion, opened on 29 October 2013, was the first part of the complex that was opened to the public. Trains run between Kazlıçeşme (west of Yenikapı) and Ayrılık Çeşmesi (east of Yenikapı, on the Asian side) within 10-minute intervals. Once the rehabilitation of the existing rail lines are complete, Marmaray commuter service will run west to Halkalı and east to Gebze. This service is expected to commence in 2016.

Construction of the Marmaray tunnel started in 2004 and was expected to open in April 2009. However, due to several important archaeological discoveries at Yenikapı, the opening was delayed until October 2013.

Yenikapı saw 1.4 million boardings in February 2017, making it the busiest station on the Marmaray system as well as making up 29% of all passenger boardings on the line.

Layout

References

Railway stations in Istanbul Province
Transfer Centers in Turkey
Railway stations opened in 2013
2013 establishments in Turkey
Istanbul metro stations
Fatih